Talich is a Czech surname. Notable people with the surname include:

Jan Talich (born 1967), Czech violinist and conductor
Václav Talich (1883–1961), Czech conductor, violinist and pedagogue

See also
 Talich Quartet, Czech string quartet
 11201 Talich main-belt asteroid

Czech-language surnames